is a 1956 Japanese drama film directed by Yūzō Kawashima. It is based on a novel by Yoshiko Shibaki. Director Kawashima called Suzaki Paradise: Red Light the favourite among his own films.

Synopsis 
A jobless young couple, Yoshiji and Tsutae, wind up at the outskirts of the Suzaki red-light district in Tokyo where she once worked as a prostitute. Tsutae talks her way into a waitress job at the small bar of Osami, where they rent a room. Osami, mother of two children, manages the shop alone after she was abandoned by her husband. Yoshiji starts working as an errand boy in a nearby soba shop, jealous of Tsutae whose direct manners attract the male customers. Fed up with Yoshiji's jealousy and self-pity, and their monetary struggles, she accepts the offer of Mr. Ochiai, a regular customer and owner of a radio store, to move into a flat he pays for her. Yoshiji's colleague Tamako, who feels sympathetic towards him, is worried about his deteriorating condition. When Tsutae returns to Yoshiji, who has started to get a grip on himself in the meantime, he is first reluctant. Together, they enter a bus, not knowing what their destination will be.

Cast 
 Michiyo Aratama as Tsutae
 Yukiko Todoroki as Osami
 Seizaburō Kawazu as Mr. Ochiai
 Tatsuya Mihashi as Yoshiji
 Izumi Ashikawa as Tamako
 Shōichi Ozawa as Sankichi
 Kazuko Tani

References

External links 
 
 
 

1956 films
1956 drama films
Japanese black-and-white films
Films based on Japanese novels
Films directed by Yuzo Kawashima
Nikkatsu films
Japanese drama films